The World's Congress of Representative Women was a week-long convention for the voicing of women's concerns, held within the World's Congress Auxiliary Building in conjunction with the World's Columbian Exposition (Chicago, May 1893). At 81 meetings, organized by women from each of the United States, 150,000 people came to the World's Congress Auxiliary Building and listened to speeches given by almost 500 women from 27 countries.

The World's Congress of Representative Women was arranged, sponsored and promoted by the Board of Lady Managers of the World's Congress Auxiliary, under the guidance of President Bertha Palmer, the wife of prominent Chicagoan Potter Palmer. The men of the Auxiliary formed seventeen departments and held more than 100 congresses with a variety of political, social and technical agendas; the women's branch held just one congress. Of all the congresses at the World's Columbian Exposition, the World's Congress of Representative Women was the most highly attended.

Inception

The inception of the World's Congress of Representative Women may be traced back to February, 1891, when the National Council of Women of the United States, then in session in Washington, D.C., decided to recommend to the officers of the International Council of Women that the first quinquennial session of the International Council should be held in Chicago in the summer of 1893 instead of in London as originally intended. This decision was reinforced by the very cordial invitation of Mrs. Palmer, who attended the sessions of the National Council as the delegate of the Board of Lady Managers, and as president of the Woman's Branch of the World's Congress Auxiliary. This invitation was supplemented by a similar one from Ellen Martin Henrotin (Mrs. Charles Henrotin), vice-president of the Woman's Branch of the World's Congress Auxiliary, who also was in attendance at the Council sessions.

In pursuance of the plan thus initiated, the U.S. officers of the International Council obtained the consent of the foreign officers to the proposed change from London to Chicago. The Executive Committee of the National Council of Women of the United States pledged the National Council to entertain free of expense all foreign delegates while in attendance upon the proposed meeting of the International Council.

The call for the meeting of the International Council in Chicago was promptly issued, accompanied by the pledge of entertainment above referred to, and both call and pledge were given wide publicity through the home and foreign press, and through private and official correspondence, in the early summer of 1891, the documents bearing date May 31, 1891.

In due time, as the plan of the World's Congress Auxiliary developed, the officers of the National Council of Women of the United States entered into correspondence with the Hon. Charles C. Bonney, president of the World's Congress Auxiliary, requesting that the quinquennial meeting of the International Council of Women, announced for the summer of 1893, should be adopted as one of the series of congresses organized by the Auxiliary, with the understanding that its scope should be enlarged to the greatest possible extent; that it should take the name of “The World's Congress of Representative Women;" and that it should be subject to the same rules and enjoy the same privileges as the other congresses in the series.

This formal application from the officers of the National Council of Women of the United States was made by its president, May Wright Sewall, of Indianapolis, under date of May 29, 1892. The Executive Committee of the National Council of Women, at a meeting held in Chicago on May 9th and 10th, had authorized the President of the Council, Mrs. May Wright Sewall, to represent the interests of the Council in Europe during the summer of 1892, with a view to increase foreign interest in the proposed meeting of the International Council of Women in Chicago in May, 1893.

Preparations
After this proposed meeting of the International Council of Women had been merged into the greater project of a World's Congress of Representative Women under the auspices of the World's Congress Auxiliary, Sewall naturally devoted herself, during the three months spent in Germany, Belgium, and France, in the ensuing summer, to awakening among the prominent women with whom she came in contact an interest in the proposed World's Congress of Representative Women. While invested with no official authority to represent the Auxiliary, Sewall was greatly aided in her efforts by her position as chairman of the Committee of Arrangements, and by her connection with the National and International Councils of Women, the essential features of which were already well known abroad, and served to divest the idea of a World's Congress of Women of much of the strangeness it would otherwise have assumed in the minds of foreign women.

The main objects to be accomplished in this foreign work were as follows: First, to make clear the distinction between the World's Columbian Exposition, the Board of Lady Managers, the World's Congress Auxiliary, with its Woman's Branch, and the National and International Councils of Women, these bodies being naturally confounded continually, and almost hopelessly, by those who heard of them only through the vague paragraphs of the foreign press; second, to impart a clear understanding of the magnitude of the proposed congress, both as a whole and in its infinite details and subdivisions; third, to show the exact nature of the papers and reports desired from European delegates, and the character of the subjects to be treated ; fourth, to stimulate the foreign women to appoint delegates from organizations already existing, and to form new organizations to be represented in like manner; fifth, to encourage individuals to come to Chicago whether connected with organized bodies or not; sixth, to endeavor to reach the general European public through reports, interviews, and articles published in the European press; and, seventh, to combat unceasingly not only the general apathy in regard to a project so remote in time and place, but also the specific objections everywhere encountered, based upon the date chosen for the congress, which did not fall within the foreign vacation period, upon the length, hazard, and cost of the journey, and upon the grossly exaggerated reports of the expense of living in Chicago, and the heat of Chicago summers.

In Berlin, Sewall devoted a month to personal interviews with women prominent in philanthropy and education, and to informal conferences with groups of ladies representing, among other organizations, the following: the Scheppeler-Lette Verein, the Frauenwohl, the Jugendschutz, the Vaterländischer Frauenverein, the Edelweiss Verein, the Victoria Haus, the Victoria Lyceum, the Pestalossi Froebel-Verein, the Künstlerinnen- und Schriftstellerinnen-Verein, the Mädchen Realschule-Verein, and the Volksküchen. Many of these enjoy the protection of the Empress Frederick. Among the women who were most responsive to her appeals and most influential in spreading a knowledge of the movement among a wider circle were Henriette Schrader-Breymann, Anna Von Helmholtz, Hedwig Heyl, Elisabet Kaselowsky, Lina Morgenstern, Helene Lange, Lucie Crain, Dr. Henriette Hirschfeld-Tiburtius, Frau Direktor Iessen, Claire Schubert-Feder., Ph.D.; Ulrike Henschke, Fräulein von Hobe, and Hanna Bieber-Böhm.

Sewall supplemented her work in Berlin by a visit to Hamburg, where she was granted an extended interview with the Empress Frederick, who showed herself deeply interested in the plan of the proposed congress, and declared herself ready to aid by every means in her power in securing an adequate representation of German women in its deliberations. In Brussels, Sewall addressed the Ligue belge du droit des femmes  ("Belgian Woman's Rights League"), an influential organization, whose leaders were Marie Popelin and Louis Frank. Popelin and Frank advanced the cause of women in Belgium. In Paris, Sewall spoke in the Hall of the Mairie St. Sulpice to a large audience, and devoted the following fourteen days to conferences with the leaders among the women of Paris, singly and in groups. In addition to the interest aroused in these influential groups of German, Belgian, and French women by the visit and personal solicitations of the chairman of the Committee of Arrangements, wide publicity was given to her addresses by the press of France, Russia, Belgium, England, and Italy, and thus the scope of the great congress was made known to many thousands of European women of influence in their respective localities.

Sewall returned to the U.S. early in September. Meanwhile, Rachel Foster Avery, in her office at Somerton, Philadelphia, Pennsylvania, was planning and carrying out a voluminous and searching correspondence with prominent individuals in the U.S. and other countries, and especially with the executive officers of every national body of women at home and abroad, preparing the way for the selection and appointment of prominent women from every nation on the Advisory Councils, for the selection of persons to prepare papers for the General Congress and reports for the Report Congresses, and for the formal enrollment of all national organizations of women as members of the World's Congress of Representative Women, entitled to send delegates thereto and to hold department congresses in connection therewith. The responses to the appeals thus made by the secretary were so prompt and so generally sympathetic that it became immediately evident that a wide-spread interest was aroused, and that the success of the congress was assured. Every precaution was taken to place the movement on the broadest possible plane, and thus to allay any apprehensions of unfair treatment that might arise on the part of weaker or younger organizations.

After the simple facts regarding the inception of the plan had been stated, all organizations were placed upon exactly the same level, and all official documents issued reiterated in appropriate terms the assurance that all organizations, whether large or small in membership and influence, stood upon an equal footing in the opportunities granted to each by the committee charged with the preparations for the programme of the great congress. The spirit of fairness was so manifest in all the preliminary work of the committee that organization after organization gave in its formal adhesion to the congress, until scarcely a national woman's organization in the United States or in Europe stood aloof.

The most important document was the Preliminary Address, issued in September, 1892. It was distributed in French and in English versions by tens of thousands--not at random, but to carefully selected addresses in every country. It was reprinted from time to time substantially without change, either alone or as a part of more comprehensive statements, as the needs of the work required, the last edition bearing date April 12, 1893, about four weeks before the convening of the congress.

Administration
The series of World's Congresses which convened in Chicago during the World's Columbian Exposition under the auspices of the World's Congress Auxiliary were opened by a "Congress of the Representative Women of all Lands". This Congress was, without doubt, the largest and most representative gathering of women ever convened in the U.S. or any other country. It assembled in the Woman's Building on Monday morning, May 15, 1893, immediately after the general opening of the World's Congress series, and adjourned Sunday evening, May 21, 1893. There were 76 sessions and over 600 participants. The greatest interest was manifested by participants from all parts of the world, and the aggregate attendance for the week was over 150,000.

While the officers of the World's Congress Auxiliary provided for the liberal participation of women in other departments of thought, like Education, Science, Music, Religion, Moral and Social Reform, Government, they also decided to give a full week to a Woman's Congress for the purpose of presenting to the people of the world the wonderful progress of women throughout the world in the many departments of intellectual activity.

This Congress, which represented the "Department of Woman's Progress" in the general programme of the World's Congress Auxiliary, was under the direct supervision of the Woman's Branch of the Auxiliary, of which Bertha Palmer was president and Ellen Martin Henrotin, vice-president. The work of organization was committed, under the supervision of those officers, to a general committee composed of the following women: May Wright Sewall, chair; Rachel Foster Avery, secretary; Frances Willard, Dr. Sarah Hackett Stevenson, Dr. Julia Holmes Smith, Lydia Avery Coonley, Elizabeth Boynton Harbert, and Mary Spalding Brown.

Program

Education
 The Kindergarten as an Educational Agency and the Relation of the Kindergarten to Manual Training – Sarah Brown Ingersoll Cooper
 The Kindergarten and the Primary School — Miss N. Cropsey
 The Ethical Influence of Woman in Education - Kate Tupper Galpin
 The Popular Inculcation of Economy - Sara Louise Vickers Oberholtzer
 Educational Training in Its Bearing Upon the Promotion of Social Purity - Dr. Jennie de la Montagnie Lozier
 The Highest Education - Mary Mathews Adams
 The Catholic Woman as an Educator - Mary A. B. Maher

Literature and the dramatic art
 Woman's Place in the Republic of Letters - Annie Nathan Meyer
 Woman in the Republic of Letters - Alice Wellington Rollins
 Organization as a Means of Literary Culture - Charlotte Emerson Brown,
 The Polish Woman in Literature - Prepared by T. E. C., M. D.
 Insurance Against Piracy of Brains — Kate Brownlee Sherwood
 Woman and the Stage – Helena Modjeska
 Woman in the Emotional Drama — Clara Morris
 The Stage and Its Women - Georgia Cayvan
 Woman's Work Upon the Stage — Julia Marlowe

Science and religion
 Woman in Science - Dr. Mary Putnam Jacobi
 The Medical Woman's Movement in the United Kingdom of Great Britain and Ireland to January, 1893 – Dr. Elizabeth Garrett Anderson
 The Medical Education of Women in Great Britain and Ireland - Dr. Sophia Jex-Blake
 Woman in the Pulpit - Rev. Florence E. Kollock
 Woman's Call to the Ministry – Rev. Caroline Bartlett Crane 
 Woman as a Minister of Religion – Rev. Mary J. Safford

Charity, philanthropy, and religion
 The Modern Deaconess Movement – Jane Bancroft Robinson, Ph.D.
 Organization among Women Considered with Respect to Philanthropy - Mary E. Richmond
 The Organized Work of Catholic Women — Lily Alice Toomy
 Woman's Place in Hebrew Thought - Minnie Dessau Louis
 Woman as a Religious Teacher — Ursula Newell Gestefeld 
 The Light in the East – Eliva Anne Thayer
 Organization Among Women as an Instrument in Promoting Religion - Mary Lowe Dickinson
 The Elevation of Womanhood Wrought through the Veneration of the Blessed Virgin – Emma F. Cary
 The Sisters of the People – Katherine Barrett Hughes

Moral and social reform
 The Moral Initiative as Related to Woman - Julia Ward Howe
 The Civil and Social Evolution of Woman - Elizabeth Cady Stanton
 Woman as a Social Leader - Josefa Humpal-Zeman
 The Ethics of Dress — Alice Timmons Toomy
 Woman's Dress from the Standpoint of Sociology - Prof. Ellen Hayes
 Dress Reform and Its Necessity – Florence Wallace Pomeroy, Viscountess Harberton
 Organization as an Instrument in Promoting Moral Reform – Maud Ballington Booth
 The Double Moral Standard, or the Moral Responsibility of Woman in Heredity – Helen H. Gardener
 The Moral Reform Union - Helen Taylor
 Temperance Education - Mary H. Hunt
 The Power of Womanliness in Dealing with Stern Problems - Florence Collins Porter
 Origin and Early History of the British Women's Temperance Association – Lady Henry Somerset
 The Origin, History, and Development of the World's Woman's Christian Temperance Union – Elizabeth Wheeler Andrew

The civil and political status of women
 The Origin and Objects of the Women's Franchise League of Great Britain and Ireland — Ursula Bright (Mrs. Jacob Bright)
 Work of the Franchise League - Florence Fenwick Miller
 Woman as an Actual Force in Politics - Ishbel Hamilton-Gordon, Marchioness of Aberdeen and Temair (The Countess of Aberdeen)
 Woman's Political Future – Frances Ellen Watkins Harper
 Woman as a Political Leaader - J. Ellen Foster

Civil law and government
 Women in Municipal Government - Ida A. Harper
 One Phase of Woman's Work for the Municipality – Lillian Davis Duncanson
 Woman's Participation in Municipal Government - Laura M. Johns
 Organization Among Women as an Instrument in Promoting the Interests of Political Liberty - Susan B. Anthony
 Woman's Position and Influence in the Civil Law – Martha Strickland
 The Ethics of Suffrage - Elizabeth Cady Stanton
 Woman as an Annex – Helen H. Gardener
 The Value of the Eastern Star as a Factor in Giving Women a Better Understanding of Business Affairs, and Especially those Relating to Legislative Matters – Mary A. Flint
 The Relation of Woman to Our Present Political Problems - Abbie A. C. Peaslie
 Women's National Indian Association - Mrs. William E. Burke
 The Women's Liberal Federation of Scotland - The Countess of Aberdeen
 Finsk Qvinnoforening, the Finnish Women's Association - Alexandra Gripenberg, Baroness Gripenberg
 The Association for Married Women's Property Rights - Thorborg Rappe, Baroness Thorborg-Rappe

Industries and occupations
 Woman the New Factor in Economics – Augusta Cooper Bristol
 A New Avenue of Employment and Investment for Business Women - Juana A. Neal
 The Bohemian Woman as a Factor in Industry and Economy - Karla Máchová
 The Contribution of Women to the Applied Arts – Florence Elizabeth Cory
 The Influence of Women in Ceramic Art - M. B. Alling
 Pottery in the Household – M. Louise McLaughlin
 The Trades and Professions Underlying the Home – Alice M. Hart
 The Effect of Modern Changes in Industrial and Social Life on Woman's Marriage Prospects — Käthe Schirmacher
 Organization Among Women as an Instrument in Promoting the Interests of Industry – Kate Bond
 The Women's Protective and Provident League of Glasgow – E. E. Anderson
 Coöperative Housekeeping — Mary Coleman Stuckert
 Domestic Service and the Family Claim - Jane Addams

The solidarity of human interests
 The Solidarity of Human Interests – Isabelle Bogelot
 Women in Spain for the Last Four Hundred Years - Catalina d'Alcala
 Woman's Position in the South American States - Matilde G. de Miro Quesada
 The Women of Brazil - Martha Sesselberg
 Women in South America – Isabel King
 The Progress of Women in England – Helen Blackburn
 A Century of Progress for Women in Canada – Mary McDonnell
 The Progress of Women in New South Wales — C. C. Montefiore
 Our Debt to Zurich - Helen L. Webster
 The Intellectual Progress of the Colored Women of the United States Since the Emancipation Proclamation – Fannie Barrier Williams
 The Organized Efforts of the Colored Women of the South to Improve their Condition - Sarah Jane Woodson Early
 Woman's War for Peace — Nico Beck-Meyer
 Woman as an Explorer – May French-Sheldon
 The Organized Development of Polish Women - Helena Modjeska
 Woman in Italy - Fanny Zampini Salazar
 Women in Agriculture in Siam — Lady Linchee Suriya
 The Position of Women in Iceland - Sigrid E. Magnusson
 The Position of Women in Syria – Hanna K. Korany

Legacy
Women at the World's Congress achieved the goals they sought. They had come from each state in the Union to staff and run offices, gather and spend resources, pay their workers, sign contracts; all without going into debt as had many of the men's subcommittees.

Notable attendees

 Hallie Quinn Brown
 Fanny Jackson Coppin
 Barbara Galpin
 Mary Kenney
 Lorraine J. Pitkin
 Mary Stuart Smith
 Lucy Stone
Germany
 Auguste Förster
 Anna Simson
 Hanna Bieber-Böhm
 Käthe Schirmacher

See also 
 Convention on the Elimination of All Forms of Discrimination Against Women (CEDAW)
 History of feminism
 First-wave feminism
 List of suffragists and suffragettes
 Queen Isabella Association

References

Citations

Attribution
 Anthony, Susan B.; Harper, Ida Husted, editors. History of Woman Suffrage, Volume IV (1883–1900), published 1902, at Internet Archive

Bibliography

 Blackwell, Alice Stone. Lucy Stone: Pioneer of Woman's Rights. Charlottesville and London: University Press of Virginia, 2001.  
 Kerr, Andrea Moore. Lucy Stone: Speaking Out for Equality. New Jersey: Rutgers University Press, 1995. 
Maddux, Kristy, author. Practicing Citizenship: Women’s Rhetoric at the 1893 Chicago World’s Fair. University Park: Penn State University Press, 2019. 
 Smith, Karen Manners, author; Cott, Nancy F., editor. New Paths to Power, 1890–1920. Chapter 7 of No Small Courage, Oxford University Press, 2000, pp. 353–357.

External links
 The Congress of Women, digital transcript at University of Pennsylvania
 The World's Congress of Representative Women, digital transcript at Google Book Search
 The Women's Building at the 1893 Exposition. Photographs and commentary about the architecture, statuary and murals
 Postcard of Woman's Building, 1893
 New York Times article, May 7, 1893

1893 in Illinois
1893 conferences
History of Chicago
History of women's rights in the United States
Feminism and history
World's Columbian Exposition
Women's conferences
History of women in Illinois